In quantum mechanics, an excited state of a system (such as an atom, molecule or nucleus) is any quantum state of the system that has a higher energy than the ground state (that is, more energy than the absolute minimum). Excitation refers to an increase in energy level above a chosen starting point, usually the ground state, but sometimes an already excited state. The temperature of a group of particles is indicative of the level of excitation (with the notable exception of systems that exhibit negative temperature).

The lifetime of a system in an excited state is usually short: spontaneous or induced emission of a quantum of energy (such as a photon or a phonon) usually occurs shortly after the system is promoted to the excited state, returning the system to a state with lower energy (a less excited state or the ground state). This return to a lower energy level is often loosely described as decay and is the inverse of excitation.

Long-lived excited states are often called metastable. Long-lived nuclear isomers and singlet oxygen are two examples of this.

Atomic excitation 
Atoms can be excited by heat, electricity, or light. A simple example of this concept comes by considering the hydrogen atom.

The ground state of the hydrogen atom corresponds to having the atom's single electron in the lowest possible orbital (that is, the spherically symmetric "1s" wave function, which, so far, has demonstrated to have the lowest possible quantum numbers). By giving the atom additional energy (for example, by the absorption of a photon of an appropriate energy), the electron is able to move into an excited state (one with one or more quantum numbers greater than the minimum possible). If the photon has too much energy, the electron will cease to be bound to the atom, and the atom will become ionized.

After excitation the atom may return to the ground state or a lower excited state, by emitting a photon with a characteristic energy. Emission of photons from atoms in various excited states leads to an electromagnetic spectrum showing a series of characteristic emission lines (including, in the case of the hydrogen atom, the Lyman, Balmer, Paschen and Brackett series).

An atom in a high excited state is termed a Rydberg atom. A system of highly excited atoms can form a long-lived condensed excited state e.g. a condensed phase made completely of excited atoms: Rydberg matter.

Perturbed gas excitation 
A collection of molecules forming a gas can be considered in an excited state if one or more molecules are elevated to kinetic energy levels such that the resulting velocity distribution departs from the equilibrium Boltzmann distribution. This phenomenon has been studied in the case of a two-dimensional gas in some detail, analyzing the time taken to relax to equilibrium.

Calculation of excited states 
Excited states are often calculated using coupled cluster, Møller–Plesset perturbation theory, multi-configurational self-consistent field, configuration interaction, and time-dependent density functional theory.

Excited-state absorption
The excitation of a system (an atom or molecule) from one excited state to a higher-energy excited state with the absorption of a photon is called excited-state absorption (ESA). Excited-state absorption is possible only when an electron has been already excited from the ground state to a lower excited state. The excited-state absorption is usually an undesired effect, but it can be useful in upconversion pumping. Excited-state absorption measurements are done using pump–probe techniques such as flash photolysis. However, it is not easy to measure them compared to ground-state absorption, and in some cases complete bleaching of the ground state is required to measure excited-state absorption.

Reaction

A further consequence of excited-state formation may be reaction of the atom or molecule in its excited state, as in photochemistry.

See also 
 Rydberg formula
 Stationary state
 Repulsive state

References

External links 
 NASA background information on ground and excited states

Quantum mechanics